Julius Thole (born 17 May 1997) is a German beach volleyball player.

He won the silver medal at the 2019 Beach Volleyball World Championships with Clemens Wickler.

References

External links

1997 births
Living people
German men's beach volleyball players
Sportspeople from Hamburg
Olympic beach volleyball players of Germany
Beach volleyball players at the 2020 Summer Olympics